Greenwood County is the name of two counties in the United States:

 Greenwood County, Kansas 
 Greenwood County, South Carolina

See also
 Greenwood (disambiguation)